Elena Sviridova (née Ivanova; born 2 April 1988) is a Paralympian athlete from Russia competing mainly in category T36 sprint events.

Sviridova competed at the 2012 Summer Paralympics in London, where she won three gold medals, in the 100m and 200m sprint, and the women's T35-38 100m sprint relay. As well as her Paralympic success Sviridova has been dominant in her field during the World Championships winning gold in both the 100m and 200m sprints at the 2011 and 2015 Games.

Personal history
Sviridova was born Elena Ivanova in Yoshkar-Ola in the former Soviet Union in 1988. Sviridova studied economics at Saint Petersburg State University of Economics and Finance. She is married to fellow Russian Paralympic athlete Vladimir Sviridov, and they have a son, who was born in 2013. Sviridova has cerebral palsy.

Notes

Paralympic athletes of Russia
Athletes (track and field) at the 2012 Summer Paralympics
Athletes (track and field) at the 2020 Summer Paralympics
Medalists at the 2012 Summer Paralympics
Medalists at the 2020 Summer Paralympics
Paralympic gold medalists for Russia
Living people
1988 births
Russian female sprinters
People from Yoshkar-Ola
Sportspeople from Mari El
World Para Athletics Championships winners
Medalists at the World Para Athletics Championships
Medalists at the World Para Athletics European Championships
Paralympic medalists in athletics (track and field)
Paralympic silver medalists for the Russian Paralympic Committee athletes
21st-century Russian women